Gasponia fascicularis is a species of beetle in the family Cerambycidae. It was described by Fairmaire in 1887. It is known from Botswana, Mozambique, Malawi, Zambia, and Tanzania.

References

Crossotini
Beetles described in 1887